On a volé la cuisse de Jupiter (literally Jupiter's thigh was stolen) is a French movie released in 1980, starring Annie Girardot and Philippe Noiret, and directed by Philippe de Broca. It is a sequel to the 1978 crime film Tendre Poulet in which both Girardot and Noiret reprise their roles as Lise Tanquerelle and Antoine Lemercier respectively.

Cast 
 Annie Girardot : Lise Tanquerelle
 Philippe Noiret : Antoine Lemercier
 Francis Perrin : Charles-Hubert Pochet
 Catherine Alric : Agnès Pochet
 Marc Dudicourt : Spiratos
 Paulette Dubost : Lise's mother
 Roger Carel : Sacharias

External links

1980 films
Films directed by Philippe de Broca
French romantic comedy films
Films with screenplays by Michel Audiard
Films shot in Greece
Films shot in Corfu
1980s French films